Markus Karlsbakk (born 7 May 2000) is a Norwegian football player who plays as a central midfielder for Raufoss, on loan from Aalesunds in 1. divisjon.

Career

Aalesunds FK
He made his debut for Aalesunds on 8 July 2017 in a 3-0 loss against local rival Molde. On 23 November 2018 he signed his first professional contract with Aalesunds.

References

2000 births
Living people
Sportspeople from Ålesund
Norwegian footballers
Aalesunds FK players
IL Hødd players
Eliteserien players
Association football midfielders